AIDAmira is a cruise ship, most recently in service with AIDA Cruises, a subsidiary of Carnival Corporation & plc, until her sale in 2022 to Ambassador Cruise Line, who renamed her Ambition and intend to commence cruising in 2023. The ship was completed in France as Mistral in 1999 for Festival Cruises. Between 2005 and 2019 she sailed as Grand Mistral with Ibero Cruises and Costa neoRiviera with Costa Cruises.

History

Mistral

The ship was originally ordered by Renaissance Cruises in the summer of 1996, but the order was later withdrawn. The yard and bankers together held ownership of the ship through a company called Auxiliaire Maritime. During construction at Chantiers de l'Atlantique, the order was taken over by Festival Cruises, which would be receiving its first new-build vessel. 

Festival Cruises chartered the ship for the first 12 years, with the option to purchase the ship after the first six years. The ship was floated out on 2 January 1999 from the shipyard and was christened on 25 June 1999 by Claude Deschamps, wife of French football player Didier Deschamps.

Mistral sailed on her maiden voyage on 17 July 1999, a 7-day cruise from Genoa to the Greek islands. She was deployed to Guadeloupe in the Caribbean after her inaugural Mediterranean season and later operated primarily from Cuba.

Festival Cruises collapsed in 2004 and most of the company's fleet, including Mistral, was sold off.

Grand Mistral

Mistral was initially sold back to Alstom Group, parent of her builders, and chartered to Viajes Iberojet and operated by Ibero Cruises, having been marketed as Iberostar Mistral. Mistral was officially sold to Iberojet at an auction and subsequently renamed Grand Mistral, debuting for the cruise line on 30 May 2005.

In 2007, Carnival Corporation & plc formed a joint venture with Orizonia Corporation under the latter's Iberojet Cruceros brand, with Carnival owning 75% and Orizonia owning 25% of the company. With this, Grand Mistral would now be owned and operated by the new joint venture company.

In August 2013 it was announced that Grand Mistral would be transferred to Costa Cruises in November, and her intended South American itineraries from Santos, Brazil would be cancelled.

Costa neoRiviera

In September 2013, Costa Cruises announced that the transferred ship, which would be renamed Costa neoRiviera, would take a central role in launching a new sub-product that would focus on smaller ships with longer port calls, more overnights, and new exotic locales among its offered itineraries. In October 2013, Costa revealed that she would be based in Dubai, with her debut set for 24 November 2013.  The company reportedly invested €10 million into transforming the ship to integrate it into its fleet.

Costa neoRiviera left Costa's fleet in October 2019 after it was announced on 25 May 2018 that the ship would be transferred to sister brand, AIDA Cruises.

AIDAmira

Costa neoRiviera entered dry dock at the San Giorgio del Porto shipyard in Genoa on 30 October 2019 for a $55 million transformation to integrate her into the AIDA fleet. She departed the shipyard on 28 November 2019 and arrived in Palma de Mallorca on 29 November 2019 for her christening. AIDAmira was officially christened by Franziska Knuppe on 30 November 2019 in Palma de Mallorca.

Her inaugural cruise was scheduled to leave on 4 December 2019 to Sète and Barcelona, but was cancelled at the last minute due to continued renovations requiring her to stay in Palma de Mallorca until 4 December. The ship left for her maiden season in South Africa, offering 14-day cruises from Cape Town. 

In March 2020, during the COVID-19 pandemic, six passengers were quarantined on AIDAmira, after they had flown on a plane with another guest who had later tested positive for COVID-19. Ultimately, more than 1,700 passengers were held, pending their test results, while the ship was docked in Cape Town.  By 19 March 2020, all tests returned negative, and passengers were allowed to disembark. She was scheduled to return to the Mediterranean from May to September 2020, sailing within the Eastern Mediterranean region from Corfu, but the pandemic caused AIDA to suspend its operations through the summer.

After being laid up since 2020, AIDA Cruises sold the ship in January 2022 to Ambassador Cruise Line.

Ambition
Ambassador Cruise Line renamed the ship Ambition and in April 2022 sent her to Bar, Montenegro to await an extensive refit prior to commencing service in March 2023. In September 2022, the ship began a six-month charter to the Scottish Government to provide accommodation on the River Clyde in Glasgow for refugees from the war in Ukraine, delaying commencement of her cruise program.

References

External links 
Costa neoRomantica - pictures and video of the ship|Costa Cruises

Ships of AIDA Cruises
Ships of Costa Cruises
Cruise ships of Italy
Ships built in France
1999 ships